Bombil & Beatrice is an Indian English language romantic thriller film directed by Kaizad Gustad. Presented by Medient In association with Crossover Joint Ventures & Quest Films Limited, the film stars Katie McGuinness, Prashant Narayanan and Piyush Mishra in lead roles. The film was released at the Cannes film festival in 2007.

Premise
Many years ago, amid palpable tension between the Britishers and the Indians due to the ongoing struggle for freedom, an English woman named Beatrice and an Indian man named Vilas were in love with each other and promised to wait for even a 100 years if they had to so as to live together. On New Year's Eve Beatrice decides to run away with Vilas but tragedy strikes before she could even meet him and her love story comes to an abrupt end. A century has passed now, and Beatrice finds out that Vilas has been reborn as Bombil. Beatrice decides to meet him and gives him a job to do.

Cast

 Prashant Narayanan as Vilas/Bombil 
 Katie McGuinness as Beatrice 
 Piyush Mishra

Production

Filming
Bombil and Beatrice was filmed in London and Mumbai.

References

External links
 

2007 thriller films
2007 films
British thriller films
Films scored by A. R. Rahman
2000s English-language films
2000s British films